Kelidbar or Kelid Bar or Kelid Bor may refer to:
 Kelidbar, Langarud
 Kelid Bar, Sowme'eh Sara